Reijo Haaparanta (born 25 August 1958) is a Finnish wrestler. He competed in the men's Greco-Roman 48 kg at the 1980 Summer Olympics.

References

External links
 

1958 births
Living people
Finnish male sport wrestlers
Olympic wrestlers of Finland
Wrestlers at the 1980 Summer Olympics
People from Kauhajoki
Sportspeople from South Ostrobothnia